A cist is a small stone-built coffin-like box or ossuary used to hold the bodies of the dead.

Cist or CIST may also refer to:

 Cistaceae, a small family of plants
 CIST-FM, a radio station
 Common and Internal Spanning Tree; see Multiple Spanning Tree Protocol

People
 Henry M. Cist (1839–1902), American Civil War general
 Charles Cist (disambiguation), several people

See also
 Cyst, a sac of tissue in the body
 O. Cist., Cistercian Order